The coat of arms of Quebec City

Crest: A mural crown, symbolizing the city, as well as Quebec City's fortified walls.
Shield:
Chief: Two gold keys on a red background, one symbolizing Québec as the capital of New France, the second one representing the capital of the province of Québec; the keys are surmounted by a maple leaf, a symbol for Canada.
Shield body: A ship representing Samuel de Champlain's Don de Dieu (and to illustrate Quebec's importance as a seaport) with full sails (a symbol of strength and courage). The wavy ribbons represent the Saint Lawrence River.
Scroll: The city motto "Don de Dieu feray valoir" (I shall put Don de Dieu—God's gift—to good use) and is a reference to Champlain's ship the Don de DieuGift of God).
Colours:
Gold (Or): for strength, faith, justice, wealth
Red (Gules): for strength, power, determination
Blue (Azure): sovereignty, majesty, serenity

References

External links
 Symbols of Identify at Quebec City

Quebec City
Municipal government of Quebec City
Quebec City
Quebec City